Samuele Olivi (born 1 August 1980) is an Italian football manager and former player, who played as a defender. He is currently a technical collaborator to Andrea Dossena at Renate.

Club career
Olivi started his career at hometown club Cesena. In 2000, Cesena were relegated from Serie B, and he was transferred to Salernitana, where he played for  seasons. He was a regular starter during the 2003–04 season, featuring in 44 out of 46 matches. The next season, however, he only made 10 appearances. In January 2005, he was signed by Piacenza, also in Serie B. In the first  seasons he was a regular starter. In the 2006–07 season, he played 22 Serie B matches, all as starter, and in the next season he played 28 matches, starting in 21 of them. After alternating between the starting eleven and the bench, he joined Pescara in August 2009.

He was released along with Massimo Ganci on 29 August 2011. On 31 August he was signed by U.S. Grosseto F.C.

On 7 June 2013 he was signed by Mantova F.C. in 2+1 year contract.

International career
Olivi was in the Italy U18 squad that lost to Portugal U18 Team in the 1999 UEFA European Under-18 Football Championship final. He also capped for the Italy U20 team that lost to the Portugal U20 side in the 2000 Toulon Tournament semi-final, but that won against the Ivory Coast U20 side in the third-place match.

He was capped for the Italy U21 side during the team's 2002 UEFA European Under-21 Football Championship qualifying campaign.

Coaching career
In June 2022, he was unveiled as part of Andrea Dossena's staff at Serie C club Renate.

References

External links
Profile at Football.it 
Profile at FIGC 

Italian footballers
Italy under-21 international footballers
A.C. Cesena players
U.S. Salernitana 1919 players
Ascoli Calcio 1898 F.C. players
Piacenza Calcio 1919 players
Delfino Pescara 1936 players
F.C. Grosseto S.S.D. players
Campionato Sammarinese di Calcio players
Serie B players
Association football defenders
People from Cesena
1980 births
Living people
Imolese Calcio 1919 players
Footballers from Emilia-Romagna
Sportspeople from the Province of Forlì-Cesena